Margaret Leonard (May 27, 1916 - March 10, 2004) was an American tax consultant and politician from Washington. Leonard was a former Republican member of Washington House of Representatives for District 3, from 1981 to 1983.

Early life 
On May 27, 1916, Leonard was born in Thorp, Washington.

Education 
Leonard attended University of Washington and the Ellensburg Normal School.

Career 
In 1967, Leonard was the first woman elected to the city council of Spokane, Washington, where she served until 1977.  In 1969, she narrowly defeated James Everett Chase, who would go on to become both the first African American member of the city council and also the first African American mayor of Spokane.

On November 4, 1980, Leonard won the election and became a Republican member of Washington House of Representatives for District 3, Position 2. Leonard defeated William J.S. May with 50.26% of the votes.

Personal life 
On March 10, 2004, Leonard died in Spokane, Washington.

References

External links 
 Margaret Leonard at ourcampaigns.com
 Women in the Washington State Legislature, Oral History Project, 1980-1983 at digitalarchives.wa.gov

1916 births
2004 deaths
Republican Party members of the Washington House of Representatives
Women state legislators in Washington (state)
21st-century American women